Georges-Octave Poulin (August 20, 1894 – March 15, 1963) was a Canadian provincial politician. He was the Union Nationale member of the Legislative Assembly of Quebec for Beauce from 1945 to 1960.

References 

1894 births
1963 deaths
People from Chaudière-Appalaches
Union Nationale (Quebec) MNAs